The 2010 Brisbane International was a joint ATP and WTA tennis tournament played on outdoor hard courts in Brisbane, Queensland. It was the 2nd edition of the tournament and was played at the Queensland Tennis Centre in Tennyson. The centre court, Pat Rafter Arena is named in honour of Australian tennis hero Patrick Rafter. It took place from 3 to 10 January 2010. It was part of the Australian Open Series in preparation for the first Grand Slam of the year. Justine Henin has announced that she will make her return to professional tennis at the 2010 Brisbane International.

Television coverage of the tournament was on Channel Seven, with live coverage of the day sessions and delayed coverage of the night sessions between 4 and 10 January.

ATP entrants

Seeds

 Rankings are as of 28 December 2009.

Other entrants
The following players received wildcards into the singles main draw:
  Carsten Ball
  John Millman
  Bernard Tomic

The following players received entry from the qualifying draw:
  Oleksandr Dolgopolov Jr.
  Matthew Ebden
  Nick Lindahl
  Julian Reister

WTA entrants

Seeds

 Rankings as of 28 December 2009.

Other entrants
The following players received wildcards into the singles main draw:
  Casey Dellacqua
  Justine Henin
  Alicia Molik

The following players received entry from the qualifying draw:
  Ekaterina Ivanova
  Sesil Karatantcheva
  Alla Kudryavtseva
  Galina Voskoboeva

Finals

Men's singles

 Andy Roddick defeated  Radek Štěpánek, 7–6(7–2), 7–6(9–7).
It was Roddick's first title of the year and 28th overall.

Women's singles

 Kim Clijsters defeated  Justine Henin, 6–3, 4–6, 7–6(8–6).
It was Clijsters' first title of the year and 36th of her career.

Men's doubles

 Jérémy Chardy /  Marc Gicquel  defeated  Lukáš Dlouhý /  Leander Paes, 6–3, 7–6(7–5).

Women's doubles

 Andrea Hlaváčková /  Lucie Hradecká defeated  Melinda Czink /  Arantxa Parra Santonja, 2–6, 7–6(7–3), [10–4].

References

External links
 Official website

 
Brisbane International
Brisbane International
2010
Brisbane International
January 2010 sports events in Australia